GMX may refer to:

 Global information management Metrics eXchange, an XML localisation standard
 GMX Mail, a web-based mail service
 GMX Multi Messenger, an instant messenger service
 Magoma language